The House of Pisani is a Venetian patrician family, originating from Pisa, which played an important role in the historic, political and economic events of the Venetian Republic during the period between the 12th and the beginning of the 18th century.

The principal male line of the family, namely the Pisanis of Santo Stefano, died out at the end of the 19th century.

People
 Niccolò Pisani,  (1324–1380), Venetian admiral, renowned for his victories in the Third Venetian–Genoese War (1350–55)
Francesco Pisani (1494–1570), cardinal of the Catholic Church appointed by Pope Leo X
 Alvise Pisani (1664–1741), 114th Doge of Venice (1735–1741)
 Andrea Pisani (1662–1718), brother of Alvise, captain-general of the Venetian navy
 Domenico Pisani (fl. 1479–1486), Lord of Santorini
 Luigi Pisani, 16th-century Italian prelate
 Vettor Pisani (1324–1380), 14th-century admiral of the Venetian fleet
 Victor Pisani, interpreter and financial adviser to Umberto I and Victor Emmanuel III

Villas

Many villas in the Veneto region were built, commissioned and owned by the Pisani family, including:
Villa Pisani, also known as La Nazionale, situated in Stra (1721)
Villa Pisani, situated in Montagnana and designed by Andrea Palladio (c. 1552)
Villa Pisani, situated in Lonigo in the frazione of Bagnolo and designed by Andrea Palladio (1544)
Villa Pisani, also known as Rocca Pisana, situated in Lonigo and designed by Vincenzo Scamozzi (1576)
Villa Pisani Bolognesi Scalabrin, situated in Vescovana

Palaces

Many palaces in Venice were owned by the Pisani family, including:
Palazzo Pisani a San Stefano - massive palace in the campo near the Ponte dell'Accademia, housing a conservatory.
Palazzo Pisani Gritti, in the San Marco district and facing the Grand Canal; now the Gritti Palace Hotel
Palazzo Pisani Moretta, in the San Polo district and facing the Grand Canal
Palazzo Soranzo Pisani, in the San Polo district and facing the Grand Canal

External links
Villa Pisani, official site
Palazzo Pisani Moretta, official site